Elections were held on November 2, 2010 to determine Maine's two members of the United States House of Representatives. Representatives were elected for two-year terms to serve in the 112th Congress from January 3, 2011 until January 3, 2013. Primary elections were held on June 8, 2010.

The races in both the 1st and 2nd districts were rated as competitive by The Cook Political Report and The Rothenberg Political Report, while only the 1st district was rated as competitive by CQ Politics. Both of Maine's incumbents (Chellie Pingree of the 1st district and Mike Michaud of the 2nd district, both Democrats) were re-elected.

A total of 564,368 votes were cast, of which 316,156 (56.02 percent) were for Democratic candidates, 248,170 (43.97 percent) were for Republican candidates, and 42 (0.01 percent) were for write-in candidates.

Overview
Results of the 2010 United States House of Representatives elections in Maine by district:

District 1

The 1st district includes Biddeford, Portland and South Portland. The district's population was 95 percent white (see Race and ethnicity in the United States Census); 91 percent were high school graduates and 32 percent had received a bachelor's degree or higher. Its median income was $53,324. In the 2008 presidential election the district gave 61 percent of its vote to Democratic nominee Barack Obama and 38 percent to Republican nominee John McCain. In 2010 the district had a Cook Partisan Voting Index of D+8.

Democrat Chellie Pingree, who took office in 2009, was the incumbent. Pingree was elected in 2008 with 55 percent of the vote. In 2010 her opponent in the general election was Republican nominee Dean Scontras, the co-owner of an alternative energy company. Pingree and Scontras were unopposed in their respective primaries. Pingree raised $1,282,675 and spent $1,290,022. Scontras raised $491,374 and spent the same amount.

In a poll of 790 likely voters, conducted by Public Policy Polling between September 2 and 6, 2010, Pingree led with 47 percent to Scontras's 38 percent, while 15 percent were undecided. A poll of 316 likely voters, conducted by Critical Insights (CI) on September 13, 2010, found Pingree leading with 53 percent to Scontras's 29 percent while 18 percent were undecided. A CI poll with a statewide sample of 405 likely voters, conducted on September 27, 2010, found Pingree leading Scontras by 54 percent to 26 percent, while 19 percent were undecided. In a poll of 346 likely voters, conducted by the Maine Center for Public Opinion between October 4 and 7, 2010, 46 percent of respondents supported Pingree while 38 percent favored Scontras and 16 percent were undecided. A CI poll of 305 registered voters, conducted on October 10 and 11, 2010, found Pingree leading with 48 percent to Scontras's 33 percent, while 18 percent remained undecided. In a poll with a statewide sample of 501 likely voters, conducted by Pan Atlantic SMS Group between October 11 and 15, 2010, 49 percent of respondents backed Pingree with 33 percent supported Scontras and 18 percent remained undecided. In a CI poll of 295 likely voters, conducted between October 13 and 17, 2010, Pingree led Scontras by 45 percent to 40 percent while 13 percent were undecided. In CI's final poll Scontras led with 45 percent to Pingree's 41 percent.

In October 2010 The Cook Political Report and CQ Politics rated the race as "likely Democratic". In November 2010 The Rothenberg Political Report rated the race as "Democrat favored". Prior to the election FiveThirtyEight's forecast gave Pingree an 80 percent chance of winning and projected that she would receive 53 percent of the vote to Scontras's 47 percent.

On election day Pingree was re-elected with 57 percent of the vote to Scontras's 43 percent. Pingree was one of eight Democratic U.S. Representatives who was elected by a larger margin in 2010 than in 2008. Pingree was again re-elected in 2012, 2014, 2016 and 2018.

General election results

External links

District 2

The 2nd district included Auburn, Bangor, Lewiston and Waterville. Its population was 94 percent white (see Race and ethnicity in the United States Census); 87 percent were high school graduates and 20 percent had received a bachelor's degree or higher. Its median income was $40,812. In the 2008 presidential election the district gave 55 percent of its vote to Democratic nominee Barack Obama and 43 percent to Republican nominee John McCain. In 2010 the district had a Cook Partisan Voting Index of D+3.
 
Democrat Mike Michaud, who took office in 2003, was the incumbent. Michaud was re-elected in 2008 with 67 percent of the vote. In 2010 Michaud's opponent in the general election was Republican nominee Jason Levesque, a businessman. Both Michaud and Levesque were unopposed in their primaries. Michaud raised $1,044,372 and spent $1,244,848. Levesque raised $542,626 and spent $529,783.
 
In a poll of 678 likely voters, conducted by Public Policy Polling between September 2 and 6, 2010, Michaud led with 45 percent to Levesque's 38 percent, while 17 percent were undecided. A poll of 287 registered voters, conducted by Critical Insights (CI) on September 13, 2010, found Michaud leading with 48 percent to Levesque's 28 percent while 24 percent were undecided. In a poll with a statewide sample of 405, conducted by CI on September 27, 2010, Michaud had the support of 44 percent while 32 percent backed Levesque and 24 percent were undecided. A CI poll of 300 likely voters, conducted on October 10 and 11, 2010, found Michaud leading with 43 percent to Levesque's 30 percent while 26 percent were undecided. In a poll with a statewide sample of 501 likely voters, conducted by Pan Atlantic SMS Group between October 11 and 15, 2010, 49 percent of respondents supported Michaud while 29 percent favored Levesque and 22 percent were undecided. A poll of 305 likely voters, conducted by CI between October 13 and 17, 2010, found Michaud leading with 49 percent to Levesque's 30 percent, while 20 percent were undecided. In a CI poll of 326 likely voters, the results of which were published later in October 2010, Michaud led with 44 percent to Levesque's 40 percent while 14 percent remained undecided.
 
In October 2010 The Cook Political Report rated the race as "likely Democratic". In November 2010 The Rothenberg Political Report rated the race as "Democrat favored". Prior to the election FiveThirtyEight's forecast gave Michaud a 92 percent chance of winning and projected that he would receive 55 percent of the vote to Levesque's 45 percent.

On election day Michaud was re-elected with 55 percent of the vote to Levesque's 45 percent. Michaud was again re-elected in 2012 and unsuccessfully ran for Governor of Maine in 2014. He was succeeded by Republican Bruce Poliquin.

General election results

External links

See also
 List of United States representatives from Maine
 United States congressional delegations from Maine

References

United States House of Representatives
Maine
2010